Thomas Byrne, VC (December 1866 Dublin – 15 March 1944) was an Irish British Army soldier. He was the recipient of the Victoria Cross (VC), the highest and most prestigious award for gallantry in the face of the enemy that can be awarded to British and Commonwealth forces.

Deed
He was about 30 years old, and a private in the 21st Lancers (Empress of India's), British Army during the Mahdist War when the following deed took place for which he was awarded the VC:

On 2 September 1898 at the Battle of Omdurman, Sudan, Private Byrne turned back in the middle of the charge of the 21st Lancers and went to the assistance of a lieutenant of the Royal Horse Guards who was wounded, dismounted, disarmed and being attacked by several Dervishes. Private Byrne already wounded, attacked these Dervishes, received a second severe wound and by his gallant conduct enabled the officer to escape.

Honours

 His Medals were sold at Auction for £40,000 at David Lay Auctioneers in Penzance, Cornwall on 25 August 2015.

Later life

He later served in the Second Boer War.
He died at Canterbury, Kent, on 15  March 1944, and is buried at the local Canterbury City Cemetery. At the time of his death he was one of only 2 surviving members of the charge of the 21st Lancers at Omdurman where he won the VC. His funeral was attended by Winston Churchill who was the last surviving member of the regiment's charge.

References

The Register of the Victoria Cross (1981, 1988 and 1997)

Ireland's VCs (Dept of Economic Development, 1995)
Monuments to Courage (David Harvey, 1999)
Irish Winners of the Victoria Cross (Richard Doherty & David Truesdale, 2000)

External links

1866 births
1944 deaths
Irish soldiers in the British Army
British Army personnel of the Mahdist War
Irish recipients of the Victoria Cross
21st Lancers soldiers
British Army personnel of the Second Boer War
Military personnel from Dublin (city)
British Army recipients of the Victoria Cross
Recipients of the Meritorious Service Medal (United Kingdom)